WSHE-FM (100.3 MHz) is a radio station licensed to Chicago, Illinois with an adult contemporary format focused on the 90s and 2000s with some 80s and 2010s music.  The station is currently owned by Hubbard Broadcasting, Its studios are located at One Prudential Plaza, with transmitter facilities atop the John Hancock Center downtown.

The station has had multiple owners since coming on the air in 1948, but has usually carried lighter music depending on industry trends, never veering too far towards any type of hard rock or rap format and specifically programmed to appeal to office listeners.

History

Beautiful music era
The station began broadcasting in 1948 as WFMF, owned by Field Enterprises. WFMF aired a beautiful music format, and its programming was used for over the air background music in stores, including Field's own department stores. The station's studios and transmitter were originally located at the Carbide & Carbon Building. In 1957, WFMF was sold to Maurice, Lois, Jerome, and Lucille Rosenfield, for $125,000.

By the mid-1950s, it had the fifth most listeners of any Chicago station during evening hours. In 1955, the FCC attempted to force stations airing "functional music" to confine such programming to subcarriers. WFMF's owners successfully challenged this FCC rule in court, with the station's large listenership among the general public being cited by the United States Court of Appeals in their 1958 ruling. In 1959, WFMF became the first beautiful music FM station to be listed in a Hooper Ratings book.

In 1966, the station was sold to Century Broadcasting for $450,000. In 1970, its transmitter was moved to the John Hancock Center, while its studios were moved there the following year.

In May 1974, the station's call letters were changed to WLOO, with the "L" often written in lower case to resemble a "1" to reflect its "FM-100" branding. The station continued to air a beautiful music format; mostly instrumental renditions of pop songs along with some soft vocalists. In the late 1970s, it was the second most listened to station in Chicago. During this time, a version of its format known as the "FM 100 Plan" was syndicated by Darrell Peters to over 100 other stations across the country.

Through the 1980s, WLOO continued airing an easy listening format, albeit with more vocals by AC artists and fewer by standards artists.

WXEZ-FM
In 1988, the call letters changed to WXEZ-FM, standing for "Extra Easy". The station evolved to a soft AC format, playing more vocals and fewer instrumentals. The station was simulcast on WXEZ AM 820. Its owner, Century Broadcasting, lost an age discrimination suit that was filed by announcers who they had fired and replaced with younger announcers when the station became WXEZ.

WPNT-FM
On November 16, 1990, the station's call letters were changed to WPNT-FM, branded as "100.3 The Point", and it began airing a hot AC format, playing hits of the 1980s and current product. The station was initially simulcast on 820 AM (which itself took the WCPT calls), but in early January 1991, its AM sister was taken off the air while its owner sold off that station and its transmitter site was re-located.

In 1994, Steve Cochran began hosting morning drive. In 1996, Fred Winston replaced Cochran as morning host.

In spring 1997, WPNT was sold to Evergreen Media for $73 million. At this time, the station was branded "Chicago's 100.3" with the slogan "The Radio Station That Picks You Up & Makes You Feel Good", airing a hot AC format, including 1980s and 1990s hits, along with currents.

When Evergreen acquired WPNT, Chancellor and Evergreen were in the process of completing their merger. The newly formed Chancellor would own too many stations in the Chicago market per FCC ownership limits. As a result, WLUP and WPNT were sold to Bonneville International, which already owned hot AC station WTMX.

WNND
As WPNT would provide in-house competition to the higher-rated WTMX, on October 6, 1997, WPNT adopted a differentiating adult contemporary format of its own as "Windy 100". That month, the station's call letters were changed to WNND to match the new moniker. The first song on "Windy" was "Forever Young" by Rod Stewart. On December 10, 2002, the station rebranded as "100.3 WNND" and shifted to an 80s/90s hits format. WNND also carried the nighttime request and dedication show "Love Notes", hosted by John Symons.

WILV
On November 5, 2004, at 7 a.m., the station adopted a rhythmic-leaning AC/rhythmic oldies format as "100.3 Love FM," and its call sign was changed to WILV. In 2006, Tommy Edwards joined "Love FM" as afternoon host, moving to mornings in 2007. Edwards would later host weekends before leaving for 104.3 WJMK in 2011.

In 2008, the station again became known as "Chicago's 100.3" and it aired an adult contemporary format.

On June 7, 2010, at 1 p.m., WILV became "Rewind 100.3", airing a 1980s based classic hits format, along with some music from 1970s and 1990s.

Bonneville announced the sale of WILV, as well as 16 other stations, to Hubbard Broadcasting on January 19, 2011. The sale was completed on April 29, 2011.

The station would gradually evolve back to adult contemporary. Cara Carriveau joined WILV as evening host in January 2013, moving to afternoons in July 2014. Carriveau remained with the station until March 2018.

On December 1, 2013, WILV rebranded back to the "Chicago's 100.3" moniker.

WSHE-FM
On March 2, 2015, after some time being branded as "SHE 100.3", the station changed their call letters from WILV to WSHE-FM, retaining the same fulltime air staff. The station's current, weekday airstaff included Brooke & Jeffrey (mornings), Lisa Kosty (middays), Rick Hall (afternoons) and Ginger Jordan (evenings).

In late June 2021, Good Karma Brands, the operator of local ESPN Radio station WMVP (1000) entered into an agreement with Hubbard Broadcasting to simulcast WMVP in HD Radio over WSHE's HD2 subchannel to allow Chicago area listeners FM access to the station and its play-by-play in some manner.

On July 29, 2022 at 10 a.m., WSHE's adult contemporary format was relaunched, with a new particular focus on 90's and 2000s music (similar to their late 2002 re-formatting), as well as modern cover versions and dance remixes of older 80s music and songs from their regular playlist, as "The NEW 100.3", with the sub-branding "SHE Loves the 90s and 2000s". There were no other changes to on-air personnel. The final song before the relaunch was "Locked Out of Heaven" by Bruno Mars, and the first song as "The NEW 100.3" was "What's Luv?" by Fat Joe and Ashanti.

References

External links
Official website

Mainstream adult contemporary radio stations in the United States
SHE-FM
Hubbard Broadcasting
Radio stations established in 1948
1948 establishments in Illinois